Georg Arnold-Graboné (also Arnold Grabone; September 11, 1896 – February 10, 1982) was a painter of German impressionism and an art teacher. Because Grabone is not his real surname, sometimes his name appears as Georg Arnold-Graboné.

Biography

Early life
Born in Munich on September 11, 1896, Arnold was the son of the Regional-President Wilheim von Arnold. He went to study at Munich Art Academy. In 1914 the young Arnold passed his Abwalt (exit examination), and volunteered as an enlistee in the German Army. While serving in World War I. he suffered a head injury from a grenade explosion. The injury left him temporarily without hearing or speech. Because of his injuries he was discharged from the army. He returned to his Schwabian homeland.

Maturity
Without the benefit of any additional schooling, Arnold began to paint everything he saw. Although his speech and hearing returned, he could not abandon his love of painting. He began to study formally in Stuttgart and then studied Cubism in Vienna under Professor Lippert. Here he became a member of a circle of painters known as the “Licht-Gruppe”.

Arnold abandoned these experimental forms and returned to more traditional painting. Some years later he would write “Ich bin kein freund der Abstracten kunst” (I am no friend of abstract art). After Vienna, Arnold returned to Munich where he studied landscape painting under Heinrich von Zügel and Leo von Konig. After Munich, he traveled to Berlin where he further refined his painting style under the well-known German impressionist Max Liebermann. Arnold once wrote that Liebermann made him into a true painter. On his stylistic naturalism, Arnold once wrote: "Ich gebe die Stimmung der Landschaft so wieder, wie ich sie emfinde und wie sie auch der Betrachter empfinden soll" (I show the texture of the landscape in the way that I feel it and, as also how I want the viewer to feel it)

In 1928 Arnold was awarded a gold medal in Vienna for his oil painting: Hardanger Fjord. In 1932 he moved to Zurich to teach at an art academy. He later became its Rector.

In 1936 he began to use the name Graboné as a "Künstlername" rather than Arnold. Graboné was derived from Garabronn, the place which contained his family home. His painter friends included Otto Pippel and Franz Xavier Woffel. Although he was financially successful as a painter, Arnold painted because of his love of the aesthetic. Once, it is told, he traded a painting for taxi fare.

Relationship with Eisenhower and Churchill
In 1951 U.S. General Dwight D. Eisenhower was stationed in Garmisch as the commander of occupied Europe. Sir Winston Churchill encouraged Eisenhower to take up painting as a hobby. Eisenhower followed Churchill's advice and began to take lessons from Arnold-Graboné. At that time Arnold-Graboné had his studio only a few miles from Eisenhower's headquarters. For a period of time Eisenhower flew twice weekly from Paris to Fürstenfeldbruck, and then by automobile to Tutzing where he took his art lessons from the professor. They formed a friendship and one of Arnold-Graboné's paintings hung in the White House. Later the former president hung one of the paintings, "Zugspitze" in his home in Gettysburg. .

Arnold-Graboné's circle of American friends acquired at NATO headquarters also included General Nordstrom and Robert L. Scott (author of "God is my copilot"). The artist marketed his works to the junior officers stationed at NATO headquarters and he often invited them to exhibitions his work. As a consequence, many young American officers purchased paintings and brought them back to the United States.

Through Eisenhower, Arnold-Graboné eventually became acquainted with Sir Winston Churchill. Churchill was interested in the artist's spatula technique and asked him for some tutelage. The two of them spent several weeks one summer in the early 1950s painting together on the Isle of Man.

Although he maintained his studio in Tutzing the artist exhibited throughout the world. In the 1950s and 1960s Arnold-Graboné had exhibitions in the United States, including New York City, Chicago, Washington DC and Sarasota, Florida. Former President Lyndon B. Johnson owned in his private collection an original Graboné titled "Arber".

Death
After a fight with cancer, Arnold-Graboné died on February 10, 1982, near Starnberg in Bavaria. He was survived by his wife, Sofie, their one son, Warner, his daughter Renate Arnold (Renee Dow and Renee Hubbell) from his previous marriage, and his two grandsons, Robert Dow and Thomas Dow. His great grandchildren, Patrick Cooper  Dow and Jack Alexander Dow.

Artistic style 
Arnold-Graboné became well known for his unique style of Palette knife painting. His technique used the texture of thickly applied paint to create an actual three-dimensional representation of a landscape. In Graboné's works, the colors are remarkable for their brilliance, distinguishing his landscapes from those of other pallet-knife painters. The brilliance is a result of Graboné's color-separation technique in knife-painting. His favorite subjects were of the Alps of Bavaria and South Tirole, the Isle of Capri, the English Garden in Munich, the lake region surrounding Starnberg, and fishing boats on the North Sea. His unusual signature is incised into the wet paint with the opposite end of the brush, almost invariably on the bottom left hand of his oil paintings (and on the bottom right for watercolors).

Selected works

See also
 Max Liebermann
 Dwight D. Eisenhower
 Winston Churchill
 List of German painters

References
d'ART, Arnold Grabone Biography by Donald Van Riper, 
Dwight D. Eisenhower Library document; Dwight D. Eisenhower Personal Holding List, page 124
Newspaper Valley News June 5, 1958

20th-century German painters
20th-century German male artists
German male painters
German Impressionist painters
German landscape painters
Deaths from cancer in Germany
1896 births
1982 deaths